Mirab Belessa or West Belessa is one of the woredas in the Amhara Region of Ethiopia. It is named after the former province of Belessa, which lay in the same area.
Part of the Semien Gondar Zone, Mirab Belessa is bordered on the south by Debub Gondar Zone, on the west by Gondar Zuria, on the north by the Wegera, and on the east by Misraq Belessa. Towns in Mirab Belessa include Arbaya. Mirab Belessa was part of former Belessa woreda.

Demographics
Based on the 2007 national census conducted by the Central Statistical Agency of Ethiopia (CSA), this woreda has a total population of 142,791, of whom 72,829 are men and 69,962 women; 7,666 or 5.4% are urban inhabitants. The majority of the inhabitants practiced Ethiopian Orthodox Christianity, with 97% reporting that as their religion, while 2.9% of the population said they were Muslim.

Notes

Districts of Amhara Region